Brloh is name of several places in the Czech Republic:

 Brloh (Český Krumlov District), a village and municipality
 Brloh (Pardubice District), a village